The  was an electric multiple unit (EMU) train type operated by the private railway operator Choshi Electric Railway in Chiba Prefecture, Japan, between 1951 and 2008.

Build details

History
MoHa 105 was renumbered MoHa 115 in May 1941 following the absorption of the Tsurumi Rinkō Railway into the Japanese National Railways (JNR) network, and later worked on the JNR Toyamako Line (now part of the Toyama Light Rail Toyamakō Line) in Toyama Prefecture. It was removed from service on 10 September 1944 and placed into storage at Ōi Works in Tokyo, and officially withdrawn on 28 March 1949.

The car was subsequently purchased by the Choshi Electric Railway, and rebuilt by  before entering service on the line from 10 August 1951.

The trolley pole current collector added on transfer to the Choshi Electric Railway was later replaced by a bow collector, and this was replaced by a PS13 lozenge-type pantograph from April 1990.

The original Kisha BW bogies were replaced in 1984 by Nippon Sharyo D-16 bogies from former Iyo Railway rolling stock.

In later years, it was used as an inspection and works train for overhead wire maintenance, with a platform added to the roof.

The car was withdrawn in fiscal 2008 and stored at Tokawa Station before being cut up in October 2009.

References

External links

 Choshi Electric Railway rolling stock profiles 

Electric multiple units of Japan
Train-related introductions in 1951
1951 in rail transport

ja:銚子電気鉄道線#過去の車両
600 V DC multiple units